Miura may refer to:

Places
Miura, Kanagawa 
Miurakaigan Station
Miura District, Kanagawa
Miura Peninsula 
Ganadería Miura, the home of the Miura fighting bull line

People
Miura (surname)
Miura clan, Japanese descended clan of the Taira
Miura Anjin, honorific title of William Adams
Miura Gorō (1847-1926), lieutenant general in the Imperial Japanese Army
Miura Haruma (1990-2020), Japanese actor, singer and model
Miura Kentaro (1966-2021), Japanese manga artist and author

Characters
Miura Haru from Reborn!
Miura Hayasaka from Yotsuba&!
Azusa Miura, a character from The Idolmaster
Naoto Miura, a character from Clockwork Planet

Other
Miura map fold 
Miura bulls, the famously ferocious bullfighting stock bred by the Ganadería Miura
The Lamborghini Miura, a sports car named for the bull breeder
"Miura", a song from the self-titled album Metro Area

See also
Miguel Mihura (1905–1977), Spanish playwright